Broke Ass Game Show (stylized as Broke A$$ Game Show) is an American television game show hosted by Derek Gaines and David Magidoff. The series premiered on MTV on February 5, 2015.

Episodes

Series overview

Season 1 (2015)

Season 2 (2015–16)

References

External links
 

2010s American comedy game shows
2015 American television series debuts
2016 American television series endings
English-language television shows
MTV original programming